Duinbergen is a railway station in the town of Knokke-Heist, West Flanders, Belgium. The station opened on 29 June 1920 and is located on line 51B. The train services are operated by National Railway Company of Belgium (NMBS).

Train services
The station is served by the following services:

Intercity services (IC-03) Knokke - Bruges - Ghent - Brussels - Leuven - Hasselt - Genk

See also
 List of railway stations in Belgium

References

External links
 
 Duinbergen railway station at Belgian Railways website

Railway stations in Belgium
Railway stations opened in 1920
Railway stations in West Flanders
Knokke-Heist